RSP-01, nicknamed Selfie-sh was a nanosatellite developed by Ryman Sat Project. RSP-01 launched from Wallops Flight Facility on board a Cygnus spacecraft on 20 February 2021.

The satellite decayed from orbit on 10 June 2022.

Overview
RSP-01 was Ryman Sat Project's second satellite. It was a 1U CubeSat weighing around 1.3 kg, and was equipped with an arm that could extend up to 10 cm. The CubeSat had three transceivers. The on board computer used Arduino and Raspberry Pi.

The project began in 2017, and development was completed by 2020. Part of the development cost was covered by a crowdfunding campaign in 2019. The RSP-01 project was led by Ryuichi Mitsui and Shuichi Ito.

Mission
RSP-01's main mission was to extend an arm carrying a camera, and photograph RSP-01 with the Earth in the background, taking selfies. The arm had a pantograph design to allow contraction after being extended.

Additionally, RSP-01 conducted image recognition by machine learning, and also had a chat function. The CubeSat used its reaction wheel to demonstrate attitude control.

See also
 Space selfie
 OPUSAT-II
 STARS-EC
 WARP-01

References

External links
 Official project site 

Satellites of Japan
2021 in Japan
Spacecraft launched in 2021